Dan Murphy's is an Australian liquor store owned by Endeavour Group, with over 250 stores across the country. The business was founded in 1952 by winemaker Daniel Francis Murphy. Dan Murphy's competes principally with Coles Group brands First Choice Liquor, Vintage Cellars and Liquorland. The business offers a "lowest liquor price guarantee" and promises to beat any competitor's advertised price.

History 
Daniel Francis Murphy, a winemaker, journalist and founder of the first wine club in Australia, learned the trade working in a liquor store owned by his father Timothy Murphy. Following a brief active stint in the RAAF, serving as a Flight Sergeant, Murphy opened his first liquor store in 1952. Located on Prahran's Chapel Street, it was just a few hundred metres away from his father's store. Murphy was heavily involved in the Australian wine industry, and he was a friend to influential winemakers, including Maurice O'Shea and Max Schubert.

After growing his business to five stores across Victoria, Murphy sold his business to Woolworths in 1998. The business has since contributed to the formation of an oligopoly in the Australian liquor market, with concerns about the ability of smaller liquor retailers to compete.

In 2019, Woolworths restructured its alcoholic drinks business to form the Endeavour Group. In June 2021, the Endeavour Group was listed as a separate entity on the Australian Securities Exchange. As well as retail brands BWS, Dan Murphy's and Langton's, it owns Australia's largest portfolio of hotels.

The Dan Murphy's branding is led by a green and white illustrated bust of founder Daniel Murphy and a serif logotype. The brand was named the #1 most meaningfully different brand in Australia for 2020 in the Kantar BrandZ ranking.

Stores 
As of 2021, there are 248  Dan Murphy's stores operating across Australia: 74 in Victoria, 69 in New South Wales, 50 in Queensland, 23 in Western Australia, 18 in South Australia, 5 in the Australian Capital Territory, and 2 in Tasmania.

In addition to its physical stores, Dan Murphy's also operates danmurphys.com.au, which is responsible for more than 50% of online sales of alcohol in Australia.

In 2016, Woolworths opened The Dan Murphy's Cellar. Located in the cellar of Dan Murphy's original Prahran store, The Cellar focusses on boutique and premium liquor products.

Criticism 
Dan Murphy's pricing strategy sparked an anti-competition problem in 2003, with industry analysts claiming that Woolworths and Coles were seeking to bankrupt rival liquor retailers, mostly by lowering prices of wine. The business has admitted to selling liquor at times below cost to "aggressively drive sales". Furthermore, the original Dan Murphy had a similar strategy with his below cost marketing being cross subsidised by fraudulent avoidance of Sales Tax to the detriment of his competitors who could not match his prices.

Another major concern amongst rival liquor retailers has been Woolworths' aggressive acquisition strategy, buying up small independent stores to increase market share against main rival Coles Group, or opening up new stores, placing pressure on existing retailers by taking away sales. In Woolworths' 2006 Annual Report, the company reported 15 new Dan Murphy's stores had opened in the reported financial year, taking the total to 56, and that the company had the sites and licences to have more than 100 stores open within the next two to three years.

References

External links 
Dan Murphy's

Companies based in Melbourne
Retail companies established in 1952
Woolworths Group (Australia)
1952 establishments in Australia
Alcohol distribution retailers in Australia
Wine_retailers